The Compton–Miller Medal is an award for the man of the series in an individual Ashes series of cricket matches between Australia and England.

The award was inaugurated in 2005 and is named after two great cricketers: the batsman Denis Compton of England and the all-rounder Keith Miller of Australia. According to David Collier, chief executive of the England and Wales Cricket Board (ECB), "Denis Compton had the post-war status of a matinee idol – with a love of life and a love of living life to the full. It was an attitude he shared with Keith Miller and they became not only great rivals but also great friends."

The new medal was announced just before the first Test in 2005 Ashes series, with Miller's widow Marie Challman and Compton's son Richard representing the two men honoured in the award's title. The two captains for the series, Michael Vaughan and Ricky Ponting, were also present.

Recipients

References

External links
The Compton–Miller medal is born

Cricket awards and rankings
Keith Miller
Awards established in 2005